Francisco Antonio Manzanares (January 25, 1843 – September 17, 1904) was an American businessman and politician.

Family background and childhood
Francisco Antonio Manzanares, son of Jose Antonio Manzanares and Maria Manuela Valdez, was born in Abiquiú, New Mexico, on January 25, 1843. Barely three years later in 1846, the Mexican–American War commenced. By the time he was seven, New Mexico had become a territory of the United States.

The Manzanares family held a very prominent place in the community. His parents were from Spanish families that moved to the New Mexico territory during the colonial period. Manzanares's father had supported the Union during the civil war, and afterward, served in the legislative assembly as an Indian Agent.

Manzanares grew up with Spanish as his first language, and during his youth attended Taos School under the instruction of Father Antonio Jose Martinez. In 1863 he began attending St. Louis University, where he studied English until 1864.

Career in business
Manzanares then began his business career with Chick, Browne, and Co. in Kansas City, the birthplace of the firm. He held a sales position there for a brief period, and then quickly relocated to New York City, where he continued his college education. While in New York, Manzanares began working at a bank. He learned valuable skills during his year in New York which resulted in a career leap upon his return to Kansas City. where he was named partner of Chick, Browne, and Co. Throughout his years working for the firm, Manzanares opened a number of markets throughout Kansas Pacific, Atchison, Topeka and Santa Fe Railway train routes. In 1879, the firm was renamed to Browne and Manzanares, with Manzanares now a full partner. The firm was then moved to Las Vegas, New Mexico.

Though New Mexico was still in a period of transition, Manzanares wasted no time in working to boost the economy. With the help of other members in the community, Manzanares planned and founded Las Vegas Waterworks Association. He did not stop there, however, and soon aided in the development of financial infrastructure of the state by opening First National Banks in Las Vegas, Santa Fe, and Raton.

A political transition
In 1882, Manzanares left the banking business and challenged Republican candidate Tranquilino Luna for a seat in Congress. Luna was declared the winner and initially was seated by the House, but Manzanares later won an election contestation and was seated. Manzanares served as a territorial delegate to the United States House of Representatives from March 5, 1884 to March 3, 1885. He did not run for re-election.

Manzanares was also a member of the board of county commissioners in San Miguel County in 1896 and 1897. He died on September 17, 1904, in Las Vegas, New Mexico.

See also
 List of Hispanic Americans in the United States Congress

Sources

1843 births
1904 deaths
American bankers
American people of Spanish descent
County commissioners in New Mexico
Manzares, Francisco
Hispanic and Latino American members of the United States Congress
Neomexicanos
19th-century American politicians
New Mexico Democrats
People from Abiquiú, New Mexico
19th-century American businesspeople
Hispanic and Latino American people in New Mexico politics